Sene District is a former district that was located in Brong-Ahafo Region (now currently in Bono East Region), Ghana. Originally created as an ordinary district assembly on 10 March 1989. However, on 28 June 2012, it was split off into two new districts: Sene West District (capital: Kwame Danso) and Sene East District (capital: Kajaji). The district assembly was located in the eastern part of Brong-Ahafo Region (now eastern part of Bono East Region) and had Kwame Danso as its capital town.

List of settlements

Sources
 
 District: Sene District

References

See also
 Sene East District
 Sene West District

Districts of Brong-Ahafo Region